Raju Rahim is a 1978 Indian Malayalam film, directed by A. B. Raj and produced by R. S. Sreenivasan. The film stars Prem Nazir, K. P. Ummer, Raghavan, Bahadoor and G. K. Pillai in the lead roles. The film has musical score by M. K. Arjunan.

Cast
Prem Nazir as Raju 
K. P. Ummer as Rahim
Raghavan as Suresh
Bahadoor as Chandrappan
G. K. Pillai as Vikraman
Vidhubala as Shobha
prathapachandran as Kesavan
Manavalan Joseph as Eastman Antony
Karan as Master Raju
Paravoor Bharathan as Bharathan
Cochin Haneefa as Babu

Soundtrack
The music was composed by M. K. Arjunan and the lyrics were written by Chirayinkeezhu Ramakrishnan Nair, R. K. Damodaran and Bharanikkavu Sivakumar.

References

External links
 

1978 films
1970s Malayalam-language films
Films directed by A. B. Raj